Rebel Soul is the ninth studio album by American musician Kid Rock and his final to be released with Atlantic Records. The album was released on November 19, 2012. The album was self-produced by Kid Rock himself. It is his first since 2007's Rock N Roll Jesus to feature his backing band Twisted Brown Trucker after being absent on 2010's Born Free. "Redneck Paradise" was written by The Young Brothers in 2007; they sent it to Kid Rock's representatives hoping he would use the song.

The album was described as a mixture of Southern rock, soul, blues, gospel and Motown Sound.

It has sold 592,000 copies in the US as of February 2015.

During NASCAR's 2012 Race to the Chase, Kid Rock introduced the last 10 races with an array of songs of the album including "Let's Ride", the title track, "The Mirror", "Celebrate" and "Mr. Rock N Roll". "Let's Ride" was used as one of the official theme songs to WWE's 2012 Tribute to the Troops event, while "Celebrate" is the official theme songs to WrestleMania XXX and would be used once again as one of the official theme songs to WrestleMania 34 alongside another fellow Kid Rock song "New Orleans" from Rock and Roll Jesus. "Let's Ride" was also used in the 2014 film, Into The Storm.

Reception

The album has received  a rating of 67 out of 100 on the ratings website Metacritic.

Track listing

Personnel
Kid Rock – vocals, guitars, piano, keyboards, organ, mellotron, slide guitar, bass, drums, percussion
 Marlon Young – guitars, slide guitar
 Jason Krause – guitar
Blake Mills – guitar
 Aaron Julison – bass
 Dave McMurray – Saxophone
Jimmie Bones – piano, organ, keyboards
 Stephanie Eulinberg – drums, percussion
 Jessica Wagner – background vocals
 Herschel C Boone – background vocals
Paul Franklin – violin
Dan Dugmore – banjo
 Aubrey Freed – violin

Charts

Weekly charts

Year-end charts

Certifications

References

External links
 Track list on Kidrock website

Kid Rock albums
2012 albums
Atlantic Records albums
Rock-and-roll albums
Soul albums by American artists